Christoph W. Bauer  (born 1968 in Kolbnitz) is an Austrian author. He grew up in Lienz and Kirchberg in Tirol and is currently living in Innsbruck.

His works have been awarded with the Prize of the Academy of Graz (2001), with the Reinhard-Priessnitz-Prize (2001) and the Prize for Lyricism by the city Innsbruck (2002). Furthermore, he won the 2002 Audience Award of the Ingeborg-Bachmann-Competition in Klagenfurt. Christoph W. Bauer was also chief editor of the literary journal Wagnis.

Christoph W. Bauer explains his work as a continuation of existing traditions. He identifies himself with a poeta legens, who finds, changes, renews and continues topics from the world literature.

Publications 
 wege verzweigt, poems, Haymon, 1999
 die mobilität des wassers müßte man mieten können, poems, Haymon, 2001
 fontanalia.fragmente, poems and prose, Haymon Verlag, 2003, 
 Aufstummen, novel, Haymon, 2004, 
 supersonic, poems, Edition Korrespondenzen, 2005, 
 Und immer wieder Cordoba, radio play (premiere: ORF Landesstudio Tirol, 2006
 Ahoi!, poams Haymon Verlag, 2007 (Hrsg.) 
 Miles G., play (premiere: 1 March 2007, Westbahntheater/Innsbruck)
 Im Alphabet der Häuser. Roman einer Stadt, Haymon, 2007, 
 Graubart Boulevard, Haymon, 2008,

External links 

 http://www.cewebe.com
 

Austrian male writers
1968 births
Living people